Arenimonas alkanexedens is a Gram-negative, facultatively anaerobic, rod-shaped and non-motile bacterium from the genus of Arenimonas which has been isolated from frozen soil from China.

References

Xanthomonadales
Bacteria described in 2017